Konstantin Lukich Gilchevsky (March 5, 1857 – after 1927) was an Imperial Russian brigade, division and corps commander. He fought in the war against the Ottoman Empire.

External links 
 Русская армия в Великой войне: Картотека проекта: Гильчевский Константин Лукич
 «Не хотел командовать грабителями и убивать грабителей»

1857 births
20th-century deaths
Russian military personnel of the Russo-Turkish War (1877–1878)
Russian military personnel of World War I